The Monastery of Tsar or Tsara Surb Astvatsatsin, also known as the Holy Mother of God Church, was an Armenian Apostolic monastery located in the village of Zar (Tsar) in the Kalbajar District in Azerbaijan. It was built in 1301 in the Principality of Khachen. It was destroyed by Azeri authorities during the Soviet era. The monastery was blown up, two 13th-century chapels were razed. The elaborately engraved stones of the church were used to build storehouses, and are now visible in the foundations of barns built by the Azeris.

References

Further reading 
 Samvel Karapetyan, 2001: Armenian Cultural Monuments in the Region of Karabakh. "Gitutiun" Publishing House of NAS RA

Destroyed churches
Churches in Azerbaijan
Christian monasteries established in the 14th century
Christian monasteries in Azerbaijan
Armenian Apostolic monasteries in Azerbaijan
Kalbajar District